Espíritu Combativo is the debut album by Argentine thrash metal band Malón; it was released in 1995.

Reception
Espíritu combativo was selected as the Argentine album of the year by the readers of the Madhouse magazine. They also included three songs in the top six songs of the year: "Castigador por herencia" (ranked #2), "Malón Mestizo" (ranked #3) and "Síntoma de la infección" (ranked #5, in a tie with "Sentir Indiano" by Almafuerte). It was also ranked #1 in the art cover, and the Argentine videoclip for "Castigador por Herencia".

Track list
 Malón mestizo
 Culto siniestro
 Síntoma de la infección
 Castigador por herencia
 Cancha de lodo
 Espíritu combativo
 Ciegos del mundo
 Gatillo fácil
 Mendigos
 Fábula del avestruz y el jabalí

Personnel
 Claudio O'Connor - Singer
 Antonio Romano - Guitarist
 Claudio Strunz - drummer
 Karlos Cuadrado - bassist

References

1995 albums
Malón (band) albums
EMI Latin albums